George H. "Hoss" Hobson (May 4, 1908 – November 19, 2001) was an American athlete and sports coach. After playing college football for Alabama State, Hobson began a coaching career at several high schools, leading his teams to four state championships. In c. 1941, he began his tenure at Alabama A&M University, for which he was best known. He served as head football coach from 1942 to 1959, and was also the athletic director for many years. In the latter position, he revived the school's baseball team and added the sports of basketball, tennis, and golf, serving as the head coach of each for a time. Hobson later served as commissioner of the SIAC and was inducted into both the NACDA and Alabama A&M Halls of Fame.

Early life and education
Hobson was born on May 4, 1908. He attended high school in Greensboro, Alabama, and was captain of his school's football and baseball teams. He played college football for Alabama State as a fullback, and was team captain in 1932. That year, he was named on multiple all-state teams and was given All-America honors by several selectors as an honorable mention. Hobson received degrees from Alabama State and from Northwestern University.

Coaching career
After graduating from Alabama State, Hobson began a coaching career, and served his first few years at several high schools including Lakeside High School. In 1937, he was named coach and science teacher at Decatur Negro High School. He was a key figure in organizing the Alabama and Southwest Georgia Athletic Conference, serving as its president for a time. By the time he began coaching college sports, Hobson had helped his high school teams win a total of four state championships, three of which were in football and the remaining one in track and field.

Hobson was named head football coach for the Alabama A&M Bulldogs in 1942, succeeding Dyke Smith. He had previously been an assistant to the team. It was his tenure at Alabama A&M which Hobson was best known for, going on to serve nearly three decades with the school and later being named athletic director and head of the physical education department. He coached football from 1942 to 1959, compiling a record of 43–83–10, before being succeeded by Louis Crews. As athletic director, Hobson took Alabama A&M from having just football, to having five sports, after reviving baseball, and adding tennis, golf, and basketball. He coached each of these sports during his tenure.

Hobson brought Alabama A&M into the Southern Intercollegiate Athletic Conference (SIAC), and their "well-balanced" program earned them respect from all other conference schools. He helped organize the Magic City Classic, one of the most popular annual black college games between Alabama A&M and Alabama State, and after his career as a coach and athletic director became a prominent figure in the SIAC. Hobson served as the conference's president from 1970 to 1983, and was a member of their Ethics Committee and Physical Education Committee. He was a SIAC parliamentarian, served for a time as the president of the Southern Coaches and Officials Association, and was a member of the NCAA Committee on Committees.

Later life and death
Hobson was inducted into the National Association of Collegiate Directors of Athletics Hall of Fame in 1988. He was also inducted into the Alabama A&M Athletic Hall of Fame as a charter member in 1992, which he helped create. The Hobson Fieldhouse at Alabama A&M was named in his honor. He died on November 19, 2001, at the age of 93.

Head coaching record

College football

References

1908 births
2001 deaths
American football fullbacks
Alabama A&M Bulldogs and Lady Bulldogs athletic directors
Alabama A&M Bulldogs football coaches
Alabama A&M Bulldogs baseball coaches
Alabama A&M Bulldogs basketball coaches
Alabama State Hornets football players
College golf coaches in the United States
College tennis coaches in the United States
High school football coaches in Alabama
High school track and field coaches in the United States
Northwestern University alumni
People from Greensboro, Alabama
Coaches of American football from Alabama
Players of American football from Alabama
Baseball coaches from Alabama
Basketball coaches from Alabama
African-American college athletic directors in the United States
African-American coaches of American football
African-American players of American football
African-American baseball coaches
African-American basketball coaches
African-American tennis coaches
20th-century African-American sportspeople